Nectriella is a genus of fungi in the class Sordariomycetes. It consists of 35 species.

References

Sordariomycetes genera
Bionectriaceae